Mohammadabad (also Romanized as Moḩammadābād) is a village in Kelarestaq-e Sharqi Rural District, in the Central District of Chalus County, Mazandaran Province, Iran. At the 2006 census, its population was 35, in 8 families.

References 

Populated places in Chalus County